Ram Krishan Purohit "R K" Purohit is a former Indian Volleyball player. He hails from Jodhpur. He was awarded the Arjuna award in 1984  by the Government of India for his achievements.

Rk Purohit born in jodhpur on 16 July 1951 known as Laal ji in Jodhpur's streets.

He is presently working as Executive Director at AnandRathi IT Pvt Limited.

References

Rajasthani people
Indian men's volleyball players
Recipients of the Arjuna Award
Volleyball players from Rajasthan
People from Jodhpur
Living people
1951 births